Bridgit Mendler is an American singer-songwriter. Her first soundtrack, Lemonade Mouth, has peaked at number 4 on the Billboard 200. Her first single, "Somebody" debuted and peaked at number 89 in the US Billboard Hot 100. Her second single, "Determinate" peaked at number 51 in the US Billboard Hot 100 and charting in two more countries. She was featured in the song, "Breakthrough" and debuted and peaked at number 88 in the US Billboard Hot 100. Mendler released that her debut studio album, Hello My Name Is..., was released on October 22, 2012. The first single, "Ready or Not", was released for digital download on August 7, 2012 and the second single "Hurricane" was released on February 12, 2013.

Common Sense Media Awards

Do Something Awards

Kids' Choice Awards

Kids' Choice Awards

Kids' Choice Awards Mexico

MTV Europe Music Awards

Radio Disney Music Awards

Shorty Awards

Teen Choice Awards

Young Artist Awards

World Music Awards

Rankings

References

Awards and nominations
Mendler, Bridgit